"Ultra Flava" is a house song by British duo Heller and Farley Project (Pete Heller and Terry Farley). After the wide renown with their remix of Ultra Naté's "How Long" in 1994 and M People's "Open Your Heart" in 1995, they released it as a single in 1996. It is a slightly re-worked version of their mix of "How Long", without Naté's vocals. They entitled it "Ultra Flava" as a nod to the track's origins. It was a huge club hit and peaked at number 22 on the UK Singles Chart, while reaching number-one on the UK Dance Singles Chart. In the US, it peaked at number three on the Billboard Hot Dance Music/Club Play chart. A black-and-white music video was also produced to promote the single.

Critical reception
Larry Flick from Billboard declared "Ultra Flava" as a "diamond-hard house gem". On the single review, he wrote, "Mega-hot U.K. production/songwriting team is primed to enjoy matching stateside success with this, a rousing instrumental anthem influenced by legendary disco bands like the SalSoul Orchestra. Partners Pete Heller and Terry Farley prove adept at crafting taut pop hooks while maintaining a credible deep-house edge. A summertime club favorite on import, the domestic pressing of "Ultra Flava" boasts refreshing new interpretations by Mousse T., Ralphi Rosario, Boris Dlugosch, and DJ Sneak. A snug radio edit could easily result in a pop/crossover smash à la Robert Miles' "Children". James Hamilton from Music Weeks RM Dance Update described it as an "infectious Robin S-ishly plopped progressive wriggly percussion groove". 

Impact and legacy
Mixmag ranked "Ultra Flava" number 33 in its list of the best singles of 1995, "Mixmag End of Year Lists: 1995".

DJ Mag ranked it number 85 in their list of the "Top 100 Club Tunes" in 1998, and in 2016 ranked the song number-one in their list of the "Top 50 Tracks of 1996".

Tomorrowland featured it in their official list of "The Ibiza 500" in 2020.

Track listing

 UK 12-inch single"Ultra Flava" (Original Flava)
"Ultra Flava" (Grant Nelson's 3 Tier Experience)
"Ultra Flava" (Vox Version)
"Ultra Flava" (Pete's Dub)

 UK 12-inch single"Ultra Flava" (Rhythm Masters Club Mix)
"Ultra Flava" (Rhythm Masters Trans Disco Mix)
"Ultra Flava" (Melody Flava)
"Ultra Flava" (Bass Flava)
"Ultra Flava" (Just a Groove)

 UK CD single"Ultra Flava" (Vox Edit) – 3:14
"Ultra Flava" (Original Edit) – 3:55
"Ultra Flava" (Original Flava) – 7:03
"Ultra Flava" (Grant Nelson's 3 Tier Experience) – 6:17 
"Ultra Flava" (Vox Version) – 6:43
"Ultra Flava" (Pete's Dub) – 7:10

 Europe CD maxi'
"Ultra Flava" (Vox Edit) – 3:45
"Ultra Flava" (Original Edit) – 3:56
"Ultra Flava" (Original Flava) – 7:03
"Ultra Flava" (Grant Nelson's 3tier Experience) – 6:16
"Ultra Flava" (Vox Version) – 6:43
"Ultra Flava" (Pete's Dub) – 7:10

Charts

Weekly charts

Year-end charts

References

1996 songs
1996 singles
AM PM Records singles
Fire Island (duo) songs
Black-and-white music videos